Breaks is a small unincorporated community and census-designated place (CDP) mostly in Buchanan County, Virginia, United States. A small portion of the CDP is in Dickenson County. Breaks is located very close to the Kentucky border and is east of Breaks Interstate Park. Breaks gets its name in reference to the "break" in Pine Mountain, a mountain range that spans along the Kentucky-Virginia border and ends near the community of Breaks. It was first listed as a CDP in the 2020 census with a population of 144.

It was in Breaks that U.S. Senator George Allen called S. R. Sidarth, a volunteer for the Jim Webb campaign and an Indian American, a macaca. This started a controversy that gained national attention.

Demographics
Breaks has a population of 377 people who are all white with 64.1% who are married, 34% married with children and 18.9% have children but are single.

Attractions
 Breaks Interstate Park
 Russell Fork, a popular whitewater rafting stream
 Willowbrook Country Club, a 9-hole golf course

References

Census-designated places in Buchanan County, Virginia
Census-designated places in Dickenson County, Virginia
Census-designated places in Virginia
Unincorporated communities in Buchanan County, Virginia
Unincorporated communities in Dickenson County, Virginia
Unincorporated communities in Virginia